The Taoyuan Martyrs' Shrine is a martyrs' shrine in Taoyuan District, Taoyuan City, Taiwan.

History
Taoyuan Martyrs' Shrine was built by the Japanese as the Touen Shinto Shrine (桃園神社) in 1938. After World War II, the Kuomintang government changed the Shinto Shrine into Hsinchu County Martyrs' Shrine, then 1950 became Taoyuan County Martyrs' Shrine. Statue of Koxinga and tablets of numerous Chinese war heros like Liu Yongfu were honoured in the main shrine.

Architecture
Taoyuan Martyrs' Shrine is one of the best-kept Shinto shrines outside of Japan. The structure is made largely of unpainted, unvarnished cypress, and the shrine incorporates Japanese and modern Taiwanese architectural styles.

See also
Furen Temple
Xinwu Tianhou Temple
Shinto shrine

References

External links

桃園忠烈祠 (Chinese)
Taoyuan Martyrs Shrine

1938 establishments in Taiwan
Taoyuan District
Martyrs' shrines in Taiwan
Buildings and structures in Taoyuan City
Tourist attractions in Taoyuan City